The French ironclad Gauloise was one of 10  armored frigates built for the French Navy during the 1860s. Commissioned in 1867, she was initially assigned to the Northern Squadron and usually served as a flagship. The ironclad played a minor role in the Franco-Prussian War of 1870–1871, blockading the Baltic and North Sea coasts of Prussia.

The ship was repeatedly placed in and out of reserve during the 1870s and spent the rest of her career in the Mediterranean, serving with the Squadron of Evolutions of the Mediterranean Squadron and later the Levant Naval Division. Gauloise was condemned in 1883 and subsequently scrapped.

Design and description

The Provence class was designed as an enlarged version of the s with thicker armor, more powerful guns, and better seakeeping qualities. They displaced . Their crew numbered 579–594 officers and enlisted men.

When the French discovered that the British ironclad  had reached  during her sea trials, they decided to add an extra cylinder to the engine of the five ships still under construction, including Gauloise, in an attempt to achieve . She had a single three-cylinder horizontal-return connecting-rod steam engine that drove the propeller shaft, using steam provided by eight boilers.

Armament and protection
The main battery of the Provence-class ships was intended to be thirty  Modèle 1858–60 rifled muzzle-loading (RML) guns, but this was changed to a mixed armament of four  Modèle 1864 RMLs and six  Modèle 1864 smoothbore muzzle-loading guns on the gundeck. Positioned on the quarterdeck and the forecastle were another 194 mm smoothbore and six 164.7 mm Modèle 1858 RMLs, at least some of which served as chase guns.

The conning tower's sides consisted of  armor plates.

Construction and service

Gauloise, named after an inhabitant of Gaul, was ordered on 16 November 1860 from the Arsenal de Brest, laid down on 24 January 1861 and launched on 26 April 1865. She was commissioned for trials on 12 April 1867, completed that same month, but was not definitively commissioned until 5 December. Gauloise was assigned to the Ironclad Division of the Northern Squadron, based in Cherbourg. On 24 July 1868, she became the flagship of Rear Admiral Charles de Dompierre d'Hornoy.

When the Franco-Prussian War began on 19 July 1870, the ship was the flagship of Rear Admiral Alexandre Dieudonné who became the second-in-command to Vice Admiral Édouard Bouët-Willaumez. Bouët-Williaumez's squadron was tasked to blockade German ports in the Heligoland Bight and departed Cherbourg on 24 July and, failing to find any German ships, proceeded to Danish waters to wait for further instructions. Bouët-Williaumez was ordered on 2 August to split his forces with half, including Gauloise, proceeding into the Baltic Sea to blockade the Prussian ports there under his command and the others to return to the Bight. The strong Prussian coastal defenses prevented any attack by the French ships, but their presence severely inhibited German shipping. Bouët-Willaumez was ordered to return to Cherbourg on 16 September where Gauloise joined the ships blockading the Bight. By then the Prussians were besieging Paris and many of the trained gunners aboard the squadron were transferred to defend the city. The squadron resumed the blockade with reduced crews although Gauloise was reduced to reserve at Brest in November.

The ship was reactivated in 1872 and became the flagship of Rear Admiral Jean Hugueteau-Chaillé, commander of the Squadron of Evolutions of the Mediterranean Squadron, and was detached to patrol the Levant. She returned to reserve in 1873 and remained at Brest in that status until she was recommissioned on 2 December 1875. Gauloise became the flagship of Rear Admiral Benjamin Jaurès on 21 February 1876. By October Rear Admiral Ernest Fauque de Jonquières had relieved Jaurès, but the ship was reduced to reserve the following month. Returning to active service on 18 April 1877, Gauloise was reassigned to the Squadron of Evolutions and became the flagship of Rear Admiral Laurent Lejeune. The following year, the ship was reassigned to the Levant Naval Division; by 1879, Lejeune had hauled down his flag and she became a private ship. Gauloise was placed in reserve in Cherbourg in 1880, condemned on 13 October 1883, and was demolished in 1884–1886.

Citations

Bibliography

Further reading

1863 ships
Provence-class ironclads
Ships built in France